Iohannes ( 440–482) was a politician of the Eastern Roman Empire.

Biography 

His family came from Lychnidus, but he was from Epidamnus (Dyrrachium). Probably he was born in ca. 440. In 467 he was consul posterior, chosen by the Eastern court, together with Illustrius Pusaeus. Between 467 and 468 he was comes et magister officiorum, and later praetorian prefect of Illyricum (he was in office in 479); he was known as a fair administrator and a protector of arts.

In 479, during the revolt of Theodoric Strabo, Iohannes was in Thessalonica, where his life was in danger twice. First he was assaulted by an enraged mob and saved by the priests and the local nobles; later he was threatened by rebel soldiers and was saved by the arrival of the patricius Adamantius. Together with Sabinianus Magnus, he successfully suggested that Emperor Zeno refuse a truce with Theodoric and keep fighting him.

Iohannes died when he was 42 years old. Christodorus wrote two poems in his honour.

Bibliography 
 Arnold Hugh Martin Jones, John Robert Martindale, John Morris, "Iohannes 29", The Prosopography of the Later Roman Empire, Cambridge University Press, 1971, pp. 600–601.

5th-century Romans
5th-century Roman consuls
Comites
Imperial Roman consuls
Magistri officiorum
Praetorian prefects of the Illyricum